Yara El-Sharkawy (born 11 April 1999) is an Egyptian fencer. She competed in the women's foil event at the 2020 Summer Olympics.

She competed at the 2015 African Fencing Championships, 2017 African Fencing Championships, 2018 African Fencing Championships, and 2019 African Fencing Championships.

References

External links
 

1999 births
Living people
Egyptian female foil fencers
Olympic fencers of Egypt
Fencers at the 2020 Summer Olympics
Place of birth missing (living people)
20th-century Egyptian women
21st-century Egyptian women